Fauvel is a surname and may refer to:

 11849 Fauvel, a minor planet
 Louis-François-Sébastien Fauvel (1758–1753), French painter, diplomat and archaeologist. 
 Albert-Auguste Fauvel (1851–1909), French naturalist
 Charles Adolphe Albert Fauvel (1840–1921), French entomologist
 Charles Fauvel (1904–1979), French aircraft designer
 Fauvel AV.22
 Fauvel AV.36
 Fauvel AV.44
 Fauvel AV.45
 Fauvel AV.48
 Fauvel AV.50
 Fauvel AV.61
 John Fauvel (1946–2001), British historian of mathematics
 Pascal Fauvel (1882–1942), French archer
 Pierre Fauvel (1866–1958), professor of zoology at the Catholic University of the West
  (1830–1895)
 William LeBoutillier Fauvel (1850–1897), merchant and political figure in Quebec

See also
 Roman de Fauvel, a 14th-century French allegorical poem
 Francis Fauvel Gouraud (1808–1847), contributor to the development of the Mnemonic major system as it is known today